Elections to state legislatures were held on November 2, 2004, alongside other elections. Elections were held for 85 legislative chambers, with all states but Louisiana, Mississippi, New Jersey, Alabama, Maryland, and Virginia holding elections in at least one house. Michigan and Minnesota held elections for their lower, but not upper houses. Six chambers in three territories and the District of Columbia were up as well. 

Republicans won control of four chambers including the Oklahoma House of Representatives for the first since 1922; the Georgia House of Representatives for the first time since 1870; the Tennessee Senate for the time since 1870; and the Indiana House of Representatives. 

Democrats took control of eight legislative chambers including the Washington Senate; the Oregon Senate, which was previously tied; both houses of the Montana legislature; both houses of the Colorado legislature for the first time since 1963; the North Carolina House of Representatives- which was previously tied; and the Vermont House of Representatives. Additionally, the Iowa Senate became tied after previously being controlled by the GOP before the election. Democrats' takeover of the Montana House only came after the Montana Supreme Court declared a Democrat a victor in a contested election that evenly split the chamber. This gave Democrats control of the chamber with the help of incoming governor Brian Schweitzer. 

The Democrats also regained the title of holding the most legislative seats across the country, winning one more seat than the Republicans.

Summary table
Regularly-scheduled elections were held in 85 of the 99 state legislative chambers in the United States. Nationwide, regularly-scheduled elections were held for 6,015 of the 7,383 legislative seats. Many legislative chambers held elections for all seats, but some legislative chambers that use staggered elections held elections for only a portion of the total seats in the chamber. The chambers not up for election either hold regularly-scheduled elections in odd-numbered years, or have four-year terms and hold all regularly-scheduled elections in presidential midterm election years.

Note that this table only covers regularly-scheduled elections; additional special elections took place concurrently with these regularly-scheduled elections.

Results

State-by-state

Upper houses

Lower houses

Results

Territorial chambers

Upper houses

Lower houses

Unicameral

Notes

References

 
 
State legislative elections
State legislature elections in the United States by year